The 1983 NCAA Indoor Track and Field Championships were contested March 11−12, 1983 at the Pontiac Silverdome in Pontiac, Michigan to determine the individual and team national champions of men's and, for the first time, women's NCAA collegiate indoor track and field events in the United States. These were the 19th annual men's championships and the 1st annual women's championships.

On the men's side, the team title was claimed by SMU; it was the Mustang's first and the last team title not won by Arkansas until 1996. For the women, Nebraska took home the inaugural team title.

Qualification
Unlike other NCAA-sponsored sports, there were not separate NCAA Division I, Division II, and Division III championships for indoor track and field until 1985. As such, all athletes and programs from all three divisions were eligible to compete.

Team standings 
 Note: Top 10 only
 Scoring: 6 points for a 1st-place finish, 4 points for 2nd, 3 points for 3rd, 2 points for 4th, and 1 point for 5th
 (DC) = Defending Champions
 Full results

Men's title

Women's title

References

NCAA Indoor Track and Field Championships
Ncaa Indoor Track And Field Championships
Ncaa Indoor Track And Field Championships
NCAA Indoor Track and Field Championships